Sathyathinte Nizhalil is 1975 Malayalam-language film directed by Babu Nandancode. The story was written by P. Shanmugham with dialogue and screenplay by Sreekumaran Thampi.  Playback singers were Ambili, K. J. Yesudas and P. Susheela, and actors were Sudheer, K. P. Ummer, Ushanandini, Bahadoor, Pappu, Thikkurisi Sukumaran Nair, Philomina, Janardanan and Kunchan.

Malayalam actor Sudheer won the 1975 "Best Actor Award" from the Kerala State Government for his role in the film.

Cast 
 Sudheer
 KP Ummer
 Bahadoor
 Janardanan
 Kunchan
 Thikkurisi Sukumaran Nair
 Pappu
 Philomina
Ushanandini
 Usharani

Soundtrack 
The music was composed by V. Dakshinamoorthy and the lyrics were written by Sreekumaran Thampi.

References

External links 
 

1970s Malayalam-language films
1975 films
Films directed by Babu Nanthankode
Films scored by V. Dakshinamoorthy
Indian black-and-white films